Truckfest is a transport festival in the United Kingdom centred on trucks and the haulage industry. As well as trade stands and music entertainment, highlights of the shows are displays of customised trucks and monster trucks

Overview

The main Truckfest event is held in Peterborough at the East of England Showground, and is billed as the biggest get-together in the lorry-driving calendar. The Peterborough event celebrated its silver (25th) anniversary in 2007 

The 2016 event was held at Peterborough on 1-2 May. A Truckfest event was held on 8–9 September 2021 at Newark Showground.

Other Truckfest events are held at Haydock Park in the northwest, the Royal Highland Centre in Scotland, the Royal Bath and West Showground in the southwest, Kent Showground in the southeast and Croft Circuit in the northeast.

See also
 List of auto shows and motor shows by continent
 List of festivals in the United Kingdom

References

External links
 Truckfest official homepage

Auto shows in the United Kingdom
Road transport in the United Kingdom
Festivals in Edinburgh
Festivals in Cambridgeshire
Culture in Peterborough